Filyakovo is a rural locality (a village) in Ramenskoye Rural Settlement, Sheksninsky District, Vologda Oblast, Russia. The population was 14 as of 2002.

Geography 
Filyakovo is located 83 km north of Sheksna (the district's administrative centre) by road. Zolotukha is the nearest rural locality.

References 

Rural localities in Sheksninsky District